Thomas Noret is an American politician. He served as a Democratic member for the 25th district of the Rhode Island House of Representatives.

Noret attended at the Bishop Hendricken High School, where he later graduated in 1987. He then attended at Community College of Rhode Island, where he earned his associate degree. Noret also attended at the Roger Williams University, where he earned his Bachelor of Science degree. He served in the Rhode Island Air National Guard. Noret worked as a law enforcement at the Coventry Police Department.

In 2019, Noret won the election for the 25th district of the Rhode Island House of Representatives. He succeeded Jared Nunes. Noret assumed his office on January 1, 2019.

References 

Living people
Place of birth missing (living people)
Year of birth missing (living people)
Democratic Party members of the Rhode Island House of Representatives
21st-century American politicians
Community College of Rhode Island alumni
Roger Williams University alumni
American police officers